George James Foley (28 November 1872 – 27 October 1945) was an Australian politician from Western Australia. He was the member for the Western Australian seat of Mount Leonora from 1911 until 1920, initially for the Labor Party until 1917 when he joined the National Labor Party. He then entered the Federal House of Representatives as the Nationalist member for the seat of Kalgoorlie, which he held until 1922.

Biography
Foley was born in Walhalla on the Victorian goldfields to Thomas Foley, a miner and railway employee, and Elizabeth Foley (née Stamp). He was educated at local schools before entering a state training college in Melbourne and gaining employment with a newspaper in Richmond. He moved to Western Australia in 1895 and took up gold mining, becoming part-owner of the Grace Darling mine at Broad Arrow. On 27 January 1902, he married Fannie Gill at the Wesley Church in Kalgoorlie. He joined the Federated Miners Union and served as its Gwalia branch president, and later became president of the North Goldfields Council of the Labor Federation.

Prior to the October 1911 state election, he was selected by Labor to contest the seat of Mount Leonora; he obtained 1,019 of the 1,172 valid votes cast and entered the Legislative Assembly. He won the seat without opposition at the 1914 election.

In March 1917, the Labor Party split in Western Australia ahead of the 1917 federal election, and a number of Labor members, including Foley, either resigned from the Party or were expelled for supporting Nationalist Senate candidates. Former premier John Scaddan and several others formed the National Labor Party with a base in the Goldfields region. Foley won the state election later that year easily against a Labor opponent. In 1918, he was also elected to the Perth City Council for a one-year term.

On 18 November 1920, Foley resigned from the Legislative Assembly to contest the Kalgoorlie federal by-election, which had been called due to the expulsion of Labor member Hugh Mahon from the House of Representatives. Foley contested the by-election as a Nationalist Party member, and won against Mahon. He was defeated at the 1922 election, and failed to win the state seat of Kimberley at the 1924 election. He worked as an auctioneer in Perth before retiring to Kalgoorlie.

George Foley died on 27 October 1945 in the Perth suburb of Mount Hawthorn and was buried in the Congregationalist section of Karrakatta Cemetery. He had no children.

References

1872 births
1945 deaths
Members of the Australian House of Representatives
Members of the Australian House of Representatives for Kalgoorlie
Nationalist Party of Australia members of the Parliament of Australia
Members of the Western Australian Legislative Assembly
People from Victoria (Australia)
Burials at Karrakatta Cemetery
Australian auctioneers
Australian Labor Party members of the Parliament of Western Australia
National Labor Party members of the Parliament of Western Australia
20th-century Australian politicians